FC Vologda was a Russian football team from Vologda in Northwest Russia. It played professionally in the Russian Professional Football League from 2012 to 2013/14 season, after which it was dissolved due to financial issues.

External links
  Official site

Sport in Vologda
Association football clubs established in 2010
Association football clubs disestablished in 2014
Defunct football clubs in Russia